Umidigi (formerly known as UMI) is a Chinese consumer electronics manufacturer based in Shenzhen, Guangdong. The company was founded in February 2012 as UMI. They launched their first phone, the UMI X1 in July 2012. The company has drawn controversy under accusations of engaging in fraudulent practices and not honoring product warranties.

Products 
Umidigi has released more than 55 phone models.

Umidigi produces mobile accessories such as wireless earphones, smartwatches, a Bluetooth selfie stick/tripod combo, and a wireless charging pad. These products go under the brand names Ubeats, Upod, Uwatch, Selfie Stick, and Q1.

In Bangladesh, Umidigi is partnering with Redgreen.

A version of the Umidigi A9 was sold in the United States as the "Freedom Phone."

Criticism 

Complaints include:

 Lack of software updates and security patches.
 Lack of after sales support
 Software updates from Umidigi can bring new bugs
 Like many companies, Umidigi reportedly influences Trustpilot reviews by telling people to write product reviews to win a giveaway of a Umidigi product.

Smartphones

References

External links
 
 Exposing UMI/UMIDIGI company B E W A R E - TechUtopia on YouTube

Mobile phone companies of China
Mobile phone manufacturers
Manufacturing companies based in Shenzhen
Companies established in 2012
2012 establishments in China
Chinese brands